Knights of the Cross is the eighth studio album by German heavy metal band Grave Digger, released in 1998. It is the second album of the Middle Ages Trilogy.

Track listing
All songs composed and arranged by Chris Boltendahl and Uwe Lulis except where noted. All lyrics by Boltendahl and Yvonne Thorhauer.

The story

It is mentioned in the first track, Deus lo Vult, that "this is the fascinating tale of the Templars, probably the most powerful and mysterious organisations of the Middle Ages. The Order of The Poor Knights Of Christ and the Temple Of Solomon, originate from a group of nine Aristocrates, whose sole aim was the protection of the Holy Land. So let us undertake a journey into the past, back to the origin, rise and fall of the Order of the Templars. A journey, which will lead as to the legendary world of the Knights of the Cross."

The album tells the story of the Knights Templar from the times of the Order's birth in 1119, through the years of its glory, and finally to its fall in 1312. The first song describes the First Crusade organised in the West after Muslim victories in Asia Minor over the weakening forces of Byzantine Empire ("Deus Lo Vult", "Knights of the Cross"). Subsequent songs mention the foundation of the Knights Templar by French knight Hugues de Payens in 1119 after the establishing of the Kingdom of Jerusalem ("Monks of War"), and the new danger to the Franks brought some time later by Saladin's Egyptian armies and Nizari sect of Hashashim ("Heroes Of This Time", "Fanatic Assassins"). Then the album deals with cruelties of the Third Crusade led by Richard I of England and Philip Augustus of France ("Lionheart"), and with the myth of Templars holding the Holy Grail ("Keeper Of The Holy Grail"). The next four songs deals with the tragic end of the Order: putting hundreds of Knights Templar under arrest in 1307 to face the Inquisition on false accusations by French king Philip the Fair of heresy and homosexual practices within the Order ("Inquisition"), prisoners' statements - forced under torture - about worshipping the demon Baphomet which led to Order's cancellation by Pope Clement V in 1312 ("Baphomet"), the escape of some former Templar Knights into Scotland ("Over the Sea"), and the execution of Order's last Grand Master Jacques de Molay in 1314, who was believed to curse the King and the Pope from his stake while being burned alive, so both of them would die the same year he did ("The Curse of Jacques"). The last song deals with the alleged help of former Templar Knights to the Scots during the Battle of Bannockburn, which allowed them to acquire independence from the English rule ("Battle of Bannockburn").

Historical accuracy

The story incorporates many myths and legends (i.e. the Holy Grail, the curse of Jacques de Molay, the cult of Baphomet), but its historical content is mostly close to the truth (at least on the level of names, dates and places). Many scholars believe that the end of the Order was truly orchestrated by Philip the Fair due to his debts and deep hatred toward the Templar Knights, who in fact were most likely innocent of any heresy. They also became virtually obsolete after Acre was lost to the Saracens, marking the fall of Kingdom of Jerusalem, for now there was nowhere to fight Pagans, except for the Eastern Europe where Teutonic Knights have a de facto monopoly due to the major political role of Holy Roman Empire supporting them.

Credits
 Chris Boltendahl - vocals
 Uwe Lulis - guitars
 Jens Becker - bass
 Stefan Arnold - drums
 Hans Peter "H.P." Katzenburg - keyboards

Additional Musicians
 Rolf Köhler - backing vocals
 Piet Sielck - backing vocals, spoken word
 Hacky Hackmann - backing vocals
 Scott Cochrane - bagpipes

Production
 Chris Boltendahl - producer
 Uwe Lulis - producer
 Suno Fabitch - mixing, engineering
 John Cremer - mastering
 Markus Mayer - cover art
 Jens Rosendahl - photography

1997 albums
Grave Digger (band) albums
Concept albums
GUN Records albums